The Tahiti national under-20 football team is the national U-20 team of Tahiti and is controlled by the Tahitian Football Federation.

Competition record

FIFA U-20 World Cup record

OFC
The OFC Under 20 Qualifying Tournament is a tournament held once every two years to decide the two qualification spots for the Oceania Football Confederation (OFC) and its representatives at the FIFA U-20 World Cup.

Fixtures and results

Current squad
The following players were called up for the 2022 OFC U-19 Championship from 7 to 20 September 2022. Names in italics denote players who have been capped for the Senior team.

Caps and goals as of 6 September 2022 before the game against Tonga.

|-
! colspan="9"  style="background:#b0d3fb; text-align:left;"|
|- style="background:#dfedfd;"

|-
! colspan="9"  style="background:#b0d3fb; text-align:left;"|
|- style="background:#dfedfd;"

|-
! colspan="9"  style="background:#b0d3fb; text-align:left;"|
|- style="background:#dfedfd;"

2019 Squad
The following players have been called up for the 2019 FIFA U-20 World Cup from 23 May to 15 June 2019. Names in italics denote players who have been capped for the Senior team.

|-
! colspan="9"  style="background:#b0d3fb; text-align:left;"|
|- style="background:#dfedfd;"

|-
! colspan="9"  style="background:#b0d3fb; text-align:left;"|
|- style="background:#dfedfd;"

|-
! colspan="9"  style="background:#b0d3fb; text-align:left;"|
|- style="background:#dfedfd;"

Squad for the 2016 OFC U-20 Championship
The following players were called up for the 2016 OFC U-20 Championship from 3 to 17 September 2016. Names in italics denote players who have been capped for the Senior team.

Caps and goals as of 10 September 2016 after the game against the Cook Islands.

|-
! colspan="9"  style="background:#b0d3fb; text-align:left;"|
|- style="background:#dfedfd;"

|-

! colspan="9"  style="background:#b0d3fb; text-align:left;"|
|- style="background:#dfedfd;"

|-
! colspan="9"  style="background:#b0d3fb; text-align:left;"|
|- style="background:#dfedfd;"

References

External links
Tahiti Football Federation official website

under-20
Oceanian national under-20 association football teams